The Best of Luck Club is the second studio album by Australian singer-songwriter Alex Lahey. It was released on 17 May 2019 through Nicky Boy Records/Caroline Australia. The album peaked at number 30 on the ARIA Charts.

Lahey announced in February 2019 that the album will be followed by a nationwide Australian tour in 2019.

Track listing

Charts

References

2019 albums
Alex Lahey albums